The Seat of Government Surrender Act 1909 is an Act of the New South Wales Parliament which completed the transfer of land from New South Wales to establish the Federal Capital Territory as the seat of Commonwealth government. The Act became law on 14 December 1909, the day after the Seat of Government Acceptance Act 1909 had been passed by the Commonwealth government.

See also
 History of the Australian Capital Territory

References
 National Archives of Australia - Seat of Government Surrender Act 1909

1909 in Australian law
History of the Australian Capital Territory
New South Wales legislation
1900s in New South Wales